Maria Musso (born 14 September 1931) is a former Italian sprinter and pentathlete.

Biography
Musso was born in Turin. She participated twice in the Summer Olympics (1952 and 1956) and had 29 caps with the national team from 1949 to 1960.

Achievements

National titles
Musso has won the individual national championship six times.
2 wins in 80 metres hurdles (1950, 1957)
1 win in Long jump (1954)
3 wins in Pentathlon (1953, 1957, 1959)

See also
 Italy national relay team - All the medals

References

External links
 

1931 births
Possibly living people
Italian female sprinters
Italian female long jumpers
Italian female hurdlers
Italian female pentathletes
Athletes (track and field) at the 1952 Summer Olympics
Athletes (track and field) at the 1956 Summer Olympics
Sportspeople from Turin
Olympic athletes of Italy
European Athletics Championships medalists
20th-century Italian women
21st-century Italian women